The 2010 Women's Hockey World Cup Qualifiers refers to three qualification tournaments for the 2010 Women's Hockey World Cup. Three events were held between March and June 2010 in the United States, Russia and Chile. The winners of each tournament qualified for the final tournament. 

South Korea, Japan and Australia each won one of the three tournaments.

Qualification
Except for Africa, all other four confederations received quotas for teams to participate allocated by the International Hockey Federation based upon the FIH World Rankings at the completion of the 2008 Summer Olympics. Those teams participated at their respective continental championships but could not qualify through it, and they received the chance to qualify through one of the three tournaments based on the final ranking at each competition.

–Trinidad and Tobago withdrew

Qualifier 1

The first qualifying tournament was held in San Diego, from 26 March to 3 April. South Korea won the tournament, defeating the United States 3–1 in the final and qualifying for the FIH World Cup.

Umpires
Below are the 8 umpires appointed by the International Hockey Federation:

Julie Ashton-Lucy (AUS)
Stella Bartlema (NED)
Irene Clelland (SCO)
Marelize de Klerk (RSA)
Elena Eskina (RUS)
Nor Piza Hassan (MAS)
Alison Murphy (ENG)
Mariana Reydo (ARG)

Results
All times are Pacific Daylight Time (UTC−07:00)

Pool

Fixtures

Classification matches

Fifth and sixth place

Third and fourth place

Final

Awards

Qualifier 2

The second qualifying tournament was held in Kazan, from 17–25 April. Japan won the tournament, defeating the Azerbaijan 1–0 in the final and qualifying for the FIH World Cup.

Umpires
Below are the 9 umpires appointed by the International Hockey Federation:

Claire Adenot (FRA)
Carolina de la Fuente (ARG)
Jean Duncan (SCO)
Keely Dunn (CAN)
Christiane Hippler (GER)
Tatiana Kaltypan (UKR)
Kang Hyun-young (KOR)
Miao Lin (CHN)
Lisa Roach (AUS)

Results
All times are Moscow Daylight Time (UTC+04:00)

Pool

Fixtures

Classification matches

Fifth and sixth place

Third and fourth place

Final

Awards

Qualifier 3

The third and final qualifying tournament was held in Santiago, from 24 April to 2 May. Australia won the tournament, finishing at the top of the pool standings and qualifying for the FIH World Cup.

Umpires
Below are the 7 umpires appointed by the International Hockey Federation:

Stella Bartlema (NED)
Amy Hassick (USA)
Kelly Hudson (NZL)
Soledad Iparraguirre (ARG)
Michelle Joubert (RSA)
Irene Presenqui (ARG)
Wendy Stewart (CAN)

Results
All times are Chile Standard Time (UTC−04:00)

Pool

The winner of the tournament was decided by final standings after the pool matches, no classification matches were held.

Fixtures

Awards

Goalscorers

WAL

References

External links
Official website (Qualifier 1)
Official website (Qualifier 2)
Official website (Qualifier 3)

Women's Hockey World Cup qualifiers
 
International women's field hockey competitions hosted by Russia
International women's field hockey competitions hosted by the United States
International women's field hockey competitions hosted by Chile
Hockey World Cup Qualifiers
Hockey World Cup Qualifiers
Hockey World Cup Qualifiers